Parsons may refer to:

Places
In the United States:
 Parsons, Kansas, a city
 Parsons, Missouri, an unincorporated community
 Parsons, Tennessee, a city
 Parsons, West Virginia, a town
 Camp Parsons, a Boy Scout camp in the state of Washington
 Lake Parsons, near Parsons, Kansas
 Parsons Field, a multi-purpose stadium in Brookline, Massachusetts
 Parsons Memorial Lodge, Yosemite National Park, California
 Parsons Peak, a mountain in Yosemite National Park
 Lucy Parsons Center, an all-volunteer, nonprofit collectively run radical, independent bookstore and community center, located in Jamaica Plain, Boston, Massachusetts

On the Moon:
 Parsons (crater)

People
 Parsons (surname)
 Parsons Baronets, four baronetcies, two in Ireland, one in England, and one in the United Kingdom

Companies
 Parsons Brinckerhoff, engineering firm headquartered in New York City
 Parsons Corporation, engineering firm headquartered in Centreville, Virginia
 Parsons Marine Steam Turbine Company, company founded by Charles Parsons to build marine steam turbines
 C. A. Parsons and Company, company founded by Charles Parsons to build turbo-generators
 Parsons Dance Company, based in New York City

Schools
 Parsons School of Design, part of The New School, New York City
 Parsons Paris (2013), Paris school under Parsons School of Design
 Parsons College, a former private college in Fairfield, Iowa, closed in 1973
 Parsons Senior High School, Parsons, Kansas

Other uses
 USS Parsons (DD-949), a US Navy destroyer
 Parsons code, a system of notation used to identify a musical work
 Parsonsite, a mineral

See also
 Parson (disambiguation)
 Justice Parsons (disambiguation)